Joseph Haydn's Keyboard Concerto No. 11 in D major (Hob. XVIII / 11) was written between 1780 and 1783. It was published in 1784. It is his last concerto for a keyboard instrument.

Originally, this concerto was composed for harpsichord or fortepiano and scored for an orchestra in a relatively undeveloped galant style that had been evident in early works by Haydn. It has a lively, Hungarian Rondo finale.

Being a somewhat later composition, however, it also shows more similarities to Mozart's piano concertos than do Haydn's other keyboard concertos. Haydn and Mozart probably had become acquainted by 1784, when this concerto was published. Although Mozart returned from Italy in March 1773 at the age of seventeen, he did not turn to piano concertos until 1776, nonetheless, some biographers and music historians suggest that distinct similarities in this work by Haydn might indicate influence by the works of Mozart. Mozart acknowledged the important role of Haydn in development of music and, in correspondence, often referred to him as, "Papa Haydn".

This concerto consists of three movements:

 Vivace
 Un poco adagio
 Rondo all'Ungarese

The first and second movements contain cadenzas. The original scores of this cadenza, handwritten by Haydn, have survived.

The work is scored for solo keyboard and an orchestra consisting of two oboes, two horns in D, and strings. Nowadays, it mostly is played on piano.

See also
List of concertos by Joseph Haydn

References

External links

Concertos by Joseph Haydn
Haydn 11
Haydn 11
Compositions in D major
1783 compositions